The Greek language underwent pronunciation changes during the Koine Greek period, from about 300 BC to 400 AD. At the beginning of the period, the pronunciation was close to Classical Greek, while at the end it was almost identical to Modern Greek.

Vowel length distinctions are important for classical poetry and drama, but become less important for prose into the patristic age.

Overview

The most significant changes during the Koine Greek period concerned vowels: these were the loss of vowel length distinction, the shift of the Ancient Greek system of pitch accent to a stress accent system, and the monophthongization of diphthongs (except  and ). These changes seem widely attested from the 2nd century BC in Egyptian Greek, and in the early 2nd century AD in learned Attic inscriptions; it is therefore likely that they were already common in the 2nd century BC and generalized no later than the 2nd century AD.

This change likely took place after the vocalic changes described above occurred. It is attested in Egyptian Greek starting from the 1st century AD, and seems to have been generalized in the late Roman period.

Another series of changes was the frication of voiced stops, which is widely attested in Egyptian Greek starting from the 1st century AD, but may have been generalized at a later date, possibly in the late Roman or early Byzantine periods.

Yet another series of changes was the frication of aspirated voiceless stops, which is attested in several locations from the 1st century AD, but seems to have been generalized at a later date, possibly in the late Roman or early Byzantine period.

Controversies about reconstructions

The primary point of contention comes from the diversity of the Greek-speaking world: evidence suggests that phonological changes occurred at different times according to location and/or speaker background. It appears that many phonetic changes associated with the Koine period had already occurred in some varieties of Greek during the Classical period.

An opposition between learned language and vulgar language has been claimed for the corpus of Attic inscriptions. Some phonetic changes are attested in vulgar inscriptions since the end of the Classical period; still they are not generalized until the start of the 2nd century AD in learned inscriptions. While orthographic conservatism in learned inscriptions may account for this, contemporary transcriptions from Greek into Latin might support the idea that this is not just orthographic conservatism, but that learned speakers of Greek retained a conservative phonological system into the Roman period. On the other hand, Latin transcriptions, too, may be exhibiting orthographic conservatism.

Interpretation is more complex when different dating is found for similar phonetic changes in Egyptian papyri and learned Attic inscriptions. A first explanation would be dialectal differences (influence of foreign phonological systems through non-native speakers); changes would then have happened in Egyptian Greek before they were generalized in Attic. A second explanation would be that learned Attic inscriptions reflect a more learned variety of Greek than Egyptian papyri; learned speech would then have resisted changes that had been generalized in vulgar speech. A last explanation would be that the orthography in learned Attic inscriptions was artificially conservative; changes may then have been generalized no later than they are attested in Egyptian papyri. All these explanations are plausible to some degree, but would lead to different dating for the generalization of the same changes.

To sum this up, there is some measure of uncertainty in dating of phonetic changes; indeed, the exact dating and the rapidity of the generalization of Koine Greek phonological changes are still matters of discussion among researchers. Orthographic variants in contemporary written sources is the most direct evidence, but it is not enough to date a change in every context. Testimony of grammarians and, to a lesser extent, transcriptions into foreign language are interesting because they can indicate which pronunciation was regarded as standard by learned speakers; however, it has been argued that transcriptions may in some cases be conventional rather than phonetic, and Greek grammarians appear to describe learned pronunciation while ignoring established vulgar pronunciation.

Sample reconstructed phonological systems

Boeotian, 4th century BC

Although it belongs to the late classical period rather than the Koine Greek period, Boeotian phonology is shown here as it prefigures several traits of later Koine phonology.

By the 4th century BC, Boeotian had monophthongized most diphthongs, and featured a fricative . In contrast with Ionic-Attic and Koine,  had remained a back vowel in Boeotian (written ). Long and short vowels were still distinguished.

Early monophthongization, and perhaps even vowel weakening due to the shift to a stress accent, is also attested in Thessalian of the 3rd century BC, suggesting that several minority dialects had an advanced vowel system by the early Hellenistic period.

Short vowels

In this case when transcribing  (and also later ) the phonemic symbols  denote true mid-vowels, i.e. neither close nor open.

Long vowels

Diphthongs

Diphthongs  and  likely retained their classical pronunciation.

Stop and former stop consonants

Other consonants

No reference has been found on the status of the aspirate in Boeotian at this period.

Accentuation

The tonal accent system of Ancient Greek probably remained relevant.

Sample phonetic transcription

The following text, a Hellenistic Boeotian inscription, is rendered in a reconstructed pronunciation reflecting regional phonological developments. Monophthongization and vowel raising are clearly seen in the specialized Boeotian orthography which uses η instead of αι, ει for η and ηι (ῃ) and ω for ωι (ῳ.) There is also a spelling of ει for οι, indicating an early loss of lip-rounding resulting in /eː/, not /i(ː)/; it can therefore be inferred that at this stage οι became /øː/, not /y/. It is possible that in vulgar Attic the /y/ > /i/ shift had already occurred in the 4th century BC, but was resisted in Koine due to conservative interference. Also notable is the continued use of digamma ϝ for /w/.

Learned pronunciation, 4th century BC until early Roman period

Until the beginning of Roman times, some learned speakers may have retained a conservative pronunciation that preserved many traits of the Ancient Greek phonological system. However, already in the 4th century BC, the popular dialect in Athens may have been moving in the direction of the Koine without differences in vowel length, as noted above. Even in Attic official inscriptions, the learned pronunciation appears to have disappeared by the 2nd century AD.

The "learned pronunciation" described here is mostly pre-Koine Attic.

Short vowels

Long vowels

Both pronunciations are given as possible dialectal variants.

Diphthongs

Long first element diphthongs are written in parentheses because they were gradually monophthongized starting from the classical period; Dionysius of Halicarnassus prescribes them as a "correct" pronunciation, indicating that the diphthongs were no longer pronounced in natural speech. By the 1st century BC the process of monophthongization was over (see diachronic description below for more details).

Stop consonants

Ancient grammarians and transcriptions suggest that voiced and aspirated stop consonants were retained until the beginning of the Roman period. The voiced stops probably became fricatives before the voiceless aspirates.

Other consonants

 denotes a  geminate between vowels.

Accentuation

"Learned speech" retained the tonal accent system of Ancient Greek.

Sample phonetic transcription

The following excerpt is part of a Roman Senatorial decree to the town of Thisbae in Boeotia in 170 BC, and is transcribed with a conservative variety of Koiné in the early Roman period.

Egyptian Greek, mid 2nd century BC

By around 150 BC Egyptian Greek had monophthongized diphthongs and lost vowel length distinction.

Vowels

However, distinction between close and mid back vowels is still maintained in the chart, because this development was likely an isolated regional trait related to Coptic influence, not affecting the development of the language generally.

Diphthongs

A probable intermediate semi-vocalic stage is therefore presented here. The diphthong  was apparently retained in Egyptian at least in this century.

Stop and former stop consonants

Evidence for a fricative  in Egyptian Greek dates as far back to the 4th century BC. From the 2nd century BC, these include omissions and insertions of  before a front vowel which indicate a palatal fricative allophone in such positions. However, these may not have been standard pronunciations.   likely did not become fricative till the 1st century AD. Fricative pronunciation for aspirates may have been generalized even later in Egyptian Greek.

Other consonants

Aspiration may have begun to disappear from popular speech in the 1st century BC.

Accentuation

The accent had changed to a stress accent.

Sample phonetic transcription

The following late Ptolemaic Egyptian papyrus from 154 BC is rendered in popular pronunciation including the loss of vowel length distinction and shift to a stress accent. The substitution of αι for ε points to monophthongization; for οι, this is still in the intermediate phase of /ø/, as inferred by the lack of confusion with υ. The interchange of ι for η and υ suggests an early raising to /i/ for the former and loss of lip-rounding for the latter; this occurs only in highly restricted phonetic conditions (i.e. in labial environments), or may be an isolated dialectal trait. Horrocks' transcription already has a fricative γ with a palatal allophone before front vowels.

Popular pronunciation, 1st century BC – 2nd century AD

The loss of vowel length and the spread of Greek under Alexander the Great led to a reorganization of the vowels in the phonology of Koine Greek. There were no longer distinctions of long and short vowels in popular speech.

Former diphthongs

Stop and former stop consonants

Despite the lack of clear evidence for the fricativization of aspirated plosives in the Koine, and  perhaps started to become fricatives in areas outside Egypt such as the northern Mediterranean. See discussion below.

Other consonants

Aspiration had probably dropped out of popular speech, but possibly remained a characteristic of learned speech.

Accentuation lost distinctions of high and high-low tones, leaving only a high tone for a "stress" accent.

Sample phonetic transcription

The following papyrus letter from 100 AD is again transcribed in popular Koine pronunciation. It now shows fricative values for the second element in diphthongs αυ/ευ and for β, except in transliterations of Latin names, but aspirated plosives remain plosive. Monophthongization and loss of vowel length are clearly seen in the graphic interchanges of ι/ει, υ/οι, and ω/o. Also, there is frequent post-nasal voicing of voiceless stops, which is strengthened in Egypt because of Coptic influence but was eventually standardized everywhere and is a rule in Modern Greek.

4th century AD

Fricative values for former voiced and aspirate stop consonants were probably already common; however, some dialects may have retained voiced and aspirate stop consonants until the end of the 1st millennium.

Vowels

However, in the papyri, it is only from this period that interchange with symbols for   becomes as common as that between /, / or /.

Former diphthongs

Stop and former-stop consonants

Despite the lack of evidence for the latter change in Egyptian papyri, it is perhaps not an unreasonable assumption that fricative values for both former voiced stops and voiceless aspirated stops were common in many other dialects. It is uncertain as to when the palatal allophones for velars /k/ and /x/ appeared.

Other consonants

Accentuation

The stress accent system was probably generalized.

Sample phonetic transcription

The following excerpt from a late 4th century AD papyrus letter is rendered in late Roman/early Byzantine era popular Koine. Aspiration has been lost, and both voiced plosives and voiceless aspirated plosives have become fricatives. The omission of γ in the misspelling ὑιέvovτα (ὑγιαί–) may reflect a palatal allophone  of velar fricative  before front vowels.

Diachronic phonetic description

Loss of vowel quantity distinction

The ancient distinction between long and short vowels was lost in popular speech at the beginning of the Koine period. "By the mid-second century [BCE] however, the majority system had undergone important changes, most notably monophthongization, the loss of distinctive length, and the shift to a primary stress accent."

From the 2nd century BC, spelling errors in non-literary Egyptian papyri suggest stress accent and loss of vowel length distinction.

Transition to stress accent

The means of accenting words changed from pitch to stress, meaning that the accented syllable had only one tone option (high) and was presumably louder and/or stronger.  This shift directly corresponded with monophthongization and the loss of vowel timing distinctions, which destroyed the environment in which a pitch accent could be sustained.

From the mid 2nd century BC, spelling errors all over the Mediterranean, including occasional graphic omissions of unaccented vowels, suggest a loss of vowel length distinction, which is commonly thought to result in the loss of tonal accent. More evidence of stress accent appears in poetry starting from the late 2nd century AD – early 3rd century AD.

Diphthongs

Spurious diphthongs

Before a vowel, the diphthong  did not follow the same evolution as pre-consonantal .

While its initial value had probably been , it must have evolved to  quite early (possibly in the 6th century BC, and at any rate before 350 BC); this vowel quality has been preserved through modern times.

Short-first-element i diphthongs

However, not all scholars seem to agree. No reference on this point of debate has been found.

Still, diphthong  must have kept a diphthongal value at least in learned language until Roman times, as it is transcribed as oe in Latin. Further evidence of monophthongization is found from the early 1st century BC in Egyptian Greek, as well as in the early 2nd century AD in Palestine. Monophthongization in learned language seems attested by a  spelling for  found in a text dated from the early 2nd century AD and another from c. 240 AD.

Short-first-element u diphthongs

Further such confusions appear rarely in the papyri at the beginning of the 1st century AD. Allen also believes that the fricative pronunciation was not generalized at once; for instance, Jewish catacombs inscriptions still show a diphthongal value in the 2nd–3rd century AD.

Long-first-element i diphthongs

Diphthong  had started to become monophthongal in Attic at least as early as the 4th century BC as it was often written  and probably pronounced . In Koine Greek, most  were therefore subjected to the same evolution as original classical  and came to be pronounced .

From the 2nd century AD, Atticism caused for a widespread reintroduction of the ancient spelling with the final , but in any case was not pronounced.

Long-first-element u diphthongs

Single vowel quality

Vowels  and  started to be regularly confused in Attic inscriptions starting in the 2nd century AD, which may indicate that the quality distinction was lost around this time. However, this may as well indicate the loss of length distinction, with an earlier or simultaneous loss of quality distinction. Indeed, the fact that some less systematic confusion is found in Attic inscriptions from the 4th century BC may alternatively point to a loss of openness distinction in the 4th century BC, and the systematization of the confusion in the 2nd century AD would then have been caused by the loss of length distinction.

Koine Greek adopted for vowel  the pronunciation  of Ionic-Attic.

Loss of aspiration

The aspirate breathing (aspiration, referring here to the phoneme , which is usually marked by the rough breathing sign), which was already lost in the Ionic idioms of Asia Minor and the Aeolic of Lesbos (psilosis), later stopped being pronounced in Koine Greek. Incorrect or hypercorrect markings of assimilatory aspiration (i.e. un-aspirated plosive becomes aspirated before initial aspiration) in Egyptian papyri suggest that this loss was already under way in Egyptian Greek in the late 1st century BC. Transcriptions into foreign languages and consonant changes before aspirate testify that this transition must not have been generalized before the 2nd century AD, but transcriptions into Gothic show that it was at least well under way in the 4th century AD.

Consonants

Attic inscriptions suggest that this pronunciation was already common by the end of the 4th century BC.

Horrocks agrees with Gignac on finding evidence that geminate consonants tended to simplify beginning from the 3rd century BC, as seen in their arbitrary use in less literate writing. However, degemination was not carried out universally, as seen where the South Italian, south-eastern and some Asia Minor dialects preserve double consonants.

On the other hand, there is no specific evidence of the transition of consonant  from aspirate  to fricative  in the Koine Greek period. There is evidence for fricative  in Laconian in the 5th century BC, but this is unlikely to have influenced Koine Greek, which is largely based on Ionic-Attic. There may be evidence for fricative  in 2nd century AD Attic, in the form of omission of the second element in the  diphthongs (which were pronounced ) before . Armenian transcriptions transcribe  as  until the 10th century AD, so it seems that  was pronounced as aspirate by at least some speakers until then.

There is evidence of fricative  as far back as the 4th century BC, in the form of omissions before a back vowel. However, to Allen these do not seem to have been a standard pronunciation. Ancient grammarians describe the plosive nature of these letters,  is transcribed as b, not v, in Latin, and Cicero still seems to identify  with Latin b. However, Allen is again sceptical that this pronunciation was generalized yet. Gignac interprets similar spellings in the Egyptian papyri beginning in the 1st century AD as the spirant pronunciation for δ in the Koine, but before the 4th century AD these only occur before . However, not all scholars agree that there is a reasonable phonetic basis for the earlier fricativization of δ before ι.

The weakness of final  , frequently before a stop consonant, is attested in Egypt in both Hellenistic and Roman times, seen directly in graphic omission and hypercorrect insertion, though its complete loss would not be carried through until the medieval period and excluding the South-Italian, south-eastern and Asia Minor dialects. In Egypt this development is seen as an influence of the Coptic substrate. But at the same time, this change has now become standard in Modern Greek, and so it appears to have occurred in other areas as well.

See also

Koine Greek
Ancient Greek phonology
Modern Greek phonology

References

Bibliography

Phonology
Greek phonologies